The Friends' Almshouse of Philadelphia was founded in 1713 by the city's Quaker leadership to help destitute members of the Society of Friends, although people of other creeds were sometimes admitted.  As such, this was the first institution in America to care for poor citizens.  The combination poorhouse and workhouse occupied two small buildings built especially for it on the south side of Walnut Street between Third and Fourth Streets.  The houses were augmented with a substantial brick building fronting Walnut Street in 1729.

Not to be confused with the city-run Philadelphia Almshouse (established in 1732), the Quaker Almshouse provided food, housing, work and perhaps even modest healthcare for the indigent until 1841 when it was demolished, although one of the original houses lasted into the 1870s.  Today, the Catholic Heritage Center stands on the site.

References 
 Thompson Westcott, Historic Mansions and Buildings of Philadelphia, With Some Notice of Their Owners and Occupants (Philadelphia, PA: Porter & Coates, 1877), at 96.
 J. Thomas Scharf & Thompson Westcott, History of Philadelphia, 1609-1884, 3 vols. (Philadelphia, PA, 1884), at 856 (vol. 2).
 Center City Philadelphia in the 19th Century, Images of America Series (Charleston, SC: Arcadia Pub., 2006), at 48.

Almshouses in the United States
Buildings and structures in Philadelphia
Demolished buildings and structures in Philadelphia
1713 establishments in Pennsylvania
Buildings and structures demolished in 1841
Housing in Pennsylvania